Middleweight is a weight class in combat sports.

Boxing

Professional

Early boxing history is less than exact, but the middleweight designation seems to have begun in the 1840s. In the bare-knuckle era, the first middleweight championship fight was between Tom Chandler and Dooney Harris in 1867. Chandler won, becoming known as the American middleweight champion. The first middleweight fight with gloves may have been between George Fulljames and Jack (Nonpareil) Dempsey (no relation to the more famous heavyweight Jack Dempsey).

Current world champions

Current world rankings

The Ring

As of March 11, 2023.

Keys:
 Current The Ring world champion

BoxRec

Longest reigning world middleweight champions
Below is a list of longest reigning middleweight champions in boxing measured by the individual's longest reign. Career total time as champion (for multiple time champions) is not counted.

 Active Title Reign
 Reign has ended

Amateur

Olympic champions

 1904: 
 1908: 
 1920: 
 1924: 
 1928: 
 1932: 
 1936: 
 1948: 
 1952: 
 1956: 
 1960: 
 1964: 
 1968: 
 1972: 
 1976: 
 1980: 
 1984: 
 1988: 
 1992: 
 1996: 
 2000: 
 2004: 
 2008: 
 2012: 
 2016: 
 2020:

Kickboxing
 International Kickboxing Federation (IKF) Middleweight (Pro & Amateur) 159.1–165 lb. or 72.4–75 kg
 In Glory promotion, a middleweight division is up to 85 kg (187 lb).
 In Bellator Kickboxing promotion, a middleweight division is up to 85 kg (187 lb).

Bare-knuckle boxing
The limit for middleweight generally differs among promotions in bare-knuckle boxing:

Lethwei
In World Lethwei Championship, Naimjon Tuhtaboyev is the Middleweight Champion.

Mixed Martial Arts

In MMA, the middleweight division is from 171 lb (77.5 kg) to 185 lb (84 kg).

Anderson Silva is considered to be the greatest Middleweight MMA fighter of all time.

Taekwondo

References

Boxing weight classes
Kickboxing weight classes
Professional wrestling weight classes
Taekwondo weight classes
Wrestling weight classes